Maude is a surname, and also a feminine given name, and may refer to:

People 
 Empress Matilda (1101–1167), also called Empress Maud or Maude, first female ruler of England, mother of Henry II

First name
Maude Harcheb, French singer and reality television contestant in Les Anges de la téléréalité. Known by her mononym Maude
Maude Maggart, American singer
Maude Nugent (1873 or 1874–1958), American singer and composer
Maude Andrews Ohl (1862–1943), American journalist, poet, novelist
Maude Gillette Phillips (1860–?), American author and educator

Surname 
 Angus Maude, British politician
 Aylmer Maude with Louise Maude, British Tolstoyans
 Caitlín Maude, Irish poet and traditional singer
 Charles Bulmer Maude, served as the third incumbent at St Cyprian's Church, Kimberley, South Africa (1877–1881) and was afterwards the Vicar of Leek, Staffordshire
 Cyril Maude, British actor
 Francis Maude, British politician, son of Angus Maude
 Francis Cornwallis Maude, Irish soldier
 Frederick Francis Maude, Irish soldier
 Frederick Stanley Maude, British general of World War I
 George Ashley Maude, British Army officer and equerry
 Henry Evans Maude, British administrator and anthropologist
 Honor Courtney Maude, British-Australian authority on Oceanic string figures, wife of H.E. Maude
 Nesta Maude Ashworth
 Timothy Maude, U.S. Army general

Given name 
Maude Adams (1872–1953), American actress
Maude Allen (1879–1956), American character actress
Maude Apatow (born 1997), American actress
Maude Ballou (1925–2019), American civil rights activist
Maude Barlow (born 1947), Canadian author and activist
Maude Brown Dawson (1874–1946), wife of former Governor of West Virginia William M. O. Dawson and served as that state's First Lady, 1909-1913
Maude Cary (1878–1967), Christian American missionary to North Africa, specifically Morocco
Maude Duncan, an American newspaperwoman and a former mayor of Winslow, Arkansas
Maude Eburne (1875–1960), Canadian character actress of stage and screen, known for playing eccentric roles
Maude Farris-Luse (1887–2002), American supercentenarian
Maude Fay (1878–1964), American operatic soprano who was known for singing dramatic roles
Maude Fealy (1883–1971), American stage and film actress
Maude Frazier (1881–1963), American politician from Nevada
Maude Fulton (1881–1950), Broadway stage actress who later became a Hollywood screenwriter
Maude Garrett (born 1986), Australian broadcaster
Maude George (1888–1963), American actress of the silent era
Maude Kaufman Eggemeyer (1877–1959), early 20th Century painter associated with the Richmond Group of artists in Richmond, Indiana
Maude Kegg (1904–1996), Ojibwa writer, folk artist, and cultural interpreter
Maude Kerns (1876–1965), American artist
Maude Lloyd (1908–2004), South African ballerina and dance critic
Maude Meagher (1895–1977), novelist, author of Fantastic Traveller
Maude Nugent (1877–1958), American songwriter
Maude Odell (1870–1937), American actress
Maude Robinson (1859–1950), Quaker writer of short stories
Maude Royden (1876–1956), British preacher and suffragist
Maude Storey (1930–2003), British nurse, nursing administrator and writer, as well as President of the Royal College of Nursing from 1988 to 1990
Maude Turner Gordon (1868–1940),  American actress
Maude C. Waitt, American politician,  former member of the Ohio Senate
Maude Valérie White (1855–1937), French-born English composer

Characters 
Maude Findlay, a fictional character on the controversial 1970s sitcom Maude
Maude Flanders, a fictional character from The Simpsons
Maude Frickett, a fictional character from the repertoire of comedian Jonathan Winters
 Maude Lebowski, a fictional character played by Julianne Moore in the 1998 film "The Big Lebowski"
 Dame Marjorie "Maude" Chardin, a fictional character in the 1971 film Harold and Maude

See also
Frederick Maude (disambiguation)
Viscount Hawarden, family name Maude
Maud (given name)

English feminine given names
Surnames from given names
nn:Maude